Rhythm Power is a South Korean hip hop group that consists of rappers Hangzoo, Boi B and Geegooin. They were managed by the hip hop record label Amoeba Culture. The three group members have been childhood friends and started performing together as a group in the underground hiphop scene using the name Bang Sa Neung. The group was later signed by the hip hop label Amoeba Culture and was renamed as Rhythm Power. The group gained mainstream popularity through the participation of the South Korean rap competition Show Me the Money, with member Geegooin reaching top 10 in Show Me the Money 4 in 2015, Boi B reaching top 10 in Show Me the Money 5 in 2016, and Hangzoo becoming the winner of Show Me the Money 6 in 2017. All of the members are from Incheon and often write about the city in their lyrics.
In 2020, all three members left Amoeba Culture and established their own record label, titled TEAMPLAY MUSIC.

Members
 Hangzoo
 Boi B
 Geegooin

Discography

Extended plays

Single albums

Singles

References

External links
 

Musical groups established in 2008
South Korean hip hop groups
K-pop music groups